Norbert Peters (10 July 1942 – 4 July 2015) was a professor at RWTH Aachen University, Germany and one of the world-wide authorities in the field of combustion engineering. He headed the  Institut für Technische Verbrennung (Institute for Combustion Technology). Born in Linz, Austria, he was educated at the Karlsruhe University of Technology and later at the Technical University of Berlin. He worked in Rourkela Steel Plant for six months.

Peters's primary research interest was in the field of combustion engineering, especially turbulent flames. The interaction between turbulence and combustion constituted an important part of his research. He was author of the book titled Turbulent Combustion, a monograph with excellent but challenging insights on the advances, problems, and active research in the field of combustion in turbulent flow media. He was well known for his ideas on the Laminar flamelet model in turbulent combustion as well as for the systematic generation of reduced reaction mechanisms from detailed reaction mechanisms.

He had received numerous recognitions for his contributions, including:
 Honorary Doctorate degrees from University of Brussels (1994), Technical University of Darmstadt (2002) and ETH Zurich (2010)
 Zeldovich Medal of Combustion Institute (2002) 
 Gottfried Wilhelm Leibniz Prize of Deutsche Forschungsgemeinschaft (1990) 
 Member of the United States National Academy of Engineering (since 2002)

See also
Forman A. Williams
Amable Liñán
Paul Clavin

References

External links
 
 Institute for Combustion Technology Homepage
 

1942 births
2015 deaths
Austrian chemical engineers
20th-century German chemists
Fluid dynamicists
Gottfried Wilhelm Leibniz Prize winners
People from Linz
Academic staff of RWTH Aachen University
Karlsruhe Institute of Technology alumni
Technical University of Berlin alumni
21st-century German chemists